Natanz County is in Isfahan province, Iran. The capital of the county is the city of Natanz. At the 2006 census, the county's population was 43,947 in 12,802 households. The following census in 2011 counted 42,239 people in 13,873 households. At the 2016 census, the county's population was 43,977 in 14,959 households.

Administrative divisions

The population history and structural changes of Natanz County's administrative divisions over three consecutive censuses are shown in the following table. The latest census shows two districts, five rural districts, and four cities.

References

 

Counties of Isfahan Province